Physostigma venenosum, the Calabar bean or ordeal bean, is a leguminous plant, Endemic to tropical Africa, with a seed poisonous to humans.

Growth

Toxicology
Calabar bean contains physostigmine, a reversible cholinesterase inhibitor alkaloid. The alkaloid physostigmine acts in effect like nerve gas, influencing communication between the nerves and muscles, and resulting in copious salivation, seizures, loss of control over the bladder and bowels, and eventually loss of control over the respiratory system, causing death by asphyxiation.

The main antidote to Calabar bean poisoning is the slightly less toxic tropane alkaloid atropine, which may often succeed; and the other measures are those usually employed to stimulate the circulation and respiration. Unfortunately, the antagonism between physostigmine and atropine is not perfect, and Sir Thomas Richard Fraser demonstrated that sometimes the action of the two drugs is summated and death results sooner than from either alone: namely, atropine will save life if three and a half times the fatal dose of physostigmine has been taken, but will hasten the end if four or more times the fatal dose has been ingested.

Historical uses
The people of Old Calabar used Calabar beans or 'E-ser-e' as an ordeal poison, and administered them to persons accused of witchcraft or other crimes. It was considered to affect only the guilty; if a person accused of a crime ingested the beans without dying, they were considered innocent. A form of dueling with the seeds was also practiced, in which the two opponents divide a bean, each eating one half; that quantity has been known to kill both adversaries. Although thus highly poisonous, the bean has nothing in external aspect, taste or smell to distinguish it from any harmless leguminous seed, and disastrous effects have resulted from its being incautiously left in the way of children. The beans were first introduced into Britain in the year 1840; but the plant was not accurately described until 1861, and its physiological effects were investigated in 1863 by Sir Thomas Richard Fraser. The bean usually contains a little more than 1% of alkaloids. Two of these have been identified, one called calabarine with atropine-like effects, and the other, the drug physostigmine (with the opposite effect), used in the treatment of glaucoma, anticholinergic syndrome, myasthenia gravis and delayed gastric emptying.

See also 

 Percy Lavon Julian
 Stigmasterol

References

  This source includes pharmacological instructions, which are now presumably archaic.
 "The killer bean of Calabar", Laura Spinney, Histories, New Scientist, 28 June 2003.
 "A Modern Herbal", Maude Grieve (1931) 
 

Medicinal plants of Africa
Phaseoleae
Taxa named by John Hutton Balfour